Heinz-Leo Fischer (1902–1977) was an Austrian stage, television and film actor. During the Weimar Republic of the 1920s he appeared in plays such as Marlborough Goes to War.

Filmography

References

Bibliography 
 Youngkin, Stephen. The Lost One: A Life of Peter Lorre. University Press of Kentucky, 2005.

External links 
 

1902 births
1977 deaths
Austrian male television actors
Austrian male stage actors
Austrian male film actors
Male actors from Vienna
20th-century Austrian male actors
Officers Crosses of the Order of Merit of the Federal Republic of Germany